Pokkiri Raja ( The Rogue King) is a 2016 Indian Tamil-language supernatural comedy film written and directed by Ramprakash Rayappa, starring Jiiva, Sibiraj and Hansika Motwani. This is 25th film of Jiiva. It released on 4 March 2016. This film was later dubbed in Hindi as Bandalbaaz.

Plot
Sanjeevi (Jiiva) is a person with a yawning problem. He got fired from his old job and got dumped by his old girlfriend Sujitha. He joins a job where he meets Raghav (Manobala). Meanwhile, Sanjeevi meets Sunita (Hansika Motwani) but learns a false case from his friend Mojo (Yogi Babu) that she is a drug addict. Eventually, Sanjeevi learns that she is a clean girl who washes people who urinate near walls, and both start loving. On the other hand, a notorious don named "Cooling Glass" Guna (Sibiraj) was planning to kill someone but gets washed by Sanjeevi and got arrested. When Guna was released, he tried to kill Sanjeevi, but got blind after his sunglass breaks in Sanjeevi's yawn. Sanjeevi went to a doctor and realized that it was the power of his great grandfather Athiyan Ori, a guard of an Indian palace with a power to manipulate wind with his mouth. The British tried to steal treasures but ran from him. He meets a girl in India who came to confess to come with her but gets stabbed. Will Sanjeevi use his powers to destroy Guna forms the crux of the story.

Cast

Jiiva as Sanjeevi
Sibiraj as "Cooling Glass" Guna
Hansika Motwani as Sunitha
Manobala as Raghav
Yogi Babu as Mojo
Ramdoss as Munusu
Chitra Lakshmanan as Kothandam
Sujatha Sivakumar as Sanjeevi's mother
Mayilswamy
Mottu Kannan Louis as Mottu Kannan
PV Chandramoulli as Minister
Amritha Aiyer as Joshna

Production
The project materialised in June 2015, when it was revealed that Jiiva had accepted to work on a film to be directed by Ramprakash Rayappa, who had previously made Tamizhuku En Ondrai Azhuthavum (2015). Sibiraj also joined the film's cast, while D. Imman was signed as music director, after earlier reports suggested that Harris Jayaraj had been finalised. Jiiva had initially planned to produce the film himself before P. T. Selvakumar came forward to produce the film.

The film began production in September 2015 and Hansika Motwani was finalised to play the leading female role. A first look poster was later released during late October 2015. The satellite rights of the film were sold to Jaya TV.

Soundtrack

The soundtrack was composed by D. Imman.

Critical reception

Critics praised Rayappa's concept, but criticised the backstory and main character development. Sify wrote "Ramprakash Rayappa’s Pokkiri Raja has a terrific idea at its core and we have to definitely appreciate the director for this gutsy attempt. However, a weak back story and tacky CG work disappoints". Only Kollywood gave it a 2.75/5 and wrote "Despite a plausible set-up, the follow through is inconsistent, making Pokkiri Raja an unremarkable outing for Ramprakash." Indiaglitz gave a rating of 1.8/5 saying to "watch it at your own risk." M Suganth from The Times of India gave a more positive rating of 3/5 stating that "ultimately, it is such constant stream of laughs in the second half make up for a first half full of yawns." Behindwoods gave it a 2/5 saying that it contains a "good plot which could have been done full justice with a better screenplay." Rediff.com gave it a 1.5/5 calling it "an utter waste of time". FilmiBeat gave it a 2/5, saying that it had a brilliant idea gone awry".

References

External links
 

2016 films
2016 masala films
2010s Tamil-language films
Indian supernatural films
Indian comedy films
2016 comedy films
2010s supernatural films